This page shows the results of the Cycling Competition at the 1967 Pan American Games, held from July 23 to August 6, 1967 in Winnipeg, Manitoba, Canada. There were a total number of six events, with only men competing.

Men's competition

Men's 1.000m Match Sprint (Track)

Men's 1.000m Time Trial (Track)

Men's 4.000m Individual Pursuit (Track)

Men's 4.000m Team Pursuit (Track)

Men's Individual Race (Road)

Men's Team Time Trial (Road)

References
Results

1967
1967 Pan American Games
Pan American
1967 in road cycling
1967 in track cycling
International cycle races hosted by Canada

§ http://members.ncvc.net/members/history/Newsletters/newsletter-spokesman-1967-07.pdf